This list is an alphabetically ordered index of current and past operators. For a structured list of current operators, see List of current bus operators of the United Kingdom

This is a list of bus and coach operators of the United Kingdom. The list includes both current and historic entities, private companies and public operators, sub-brands and holding companies and public transport, private hire and tour operators.

Entries in italics are redirects.

A
 Aberdeen Corporation Transport
 Abellio London
 Abellio Surrey
 Aircoach
 Aldershot & District Traction
 Alder Valley
 W Alexander & Sons
 AMK Group
 Anglian Bus
 Arriva Buses Wales
 Arriva Colchester
 Arriva Fox County
 Arriva Guildford & West Surrey
 Arriva Kent Thameside
 Arriva London
 Arriva Midlands
 Arriva North East
 Arriva North West
 Arriva Northumbria
 Arriva Shires & Essex
 Arriva Southend
 Arriva Southern Counties
 Arriva Yorkshire
 Ausden Clark
 Avon Buses
 Ayrshire Bus Owners (A1 Service)

B
 B&D Coaches
Badgerline
 BakerBus
 Bakers Dolphin
 Barton Transport
 Bellairs & Dootson Coaches
 Big Bus Tours
 Birkenhead Transport
 Birmingham City Transport
 Birmingham Motor Traction
 Blackburn Bus Company
 Blackpool Transport
 Blue Bus of North Lanarkshire
 Blue Bus of Penwortham
 Blue Triangle
 Bluestar
 Borders Buses
 Bowers Coaches
 BrightBus
 Brighton & Hove
 Bristol Omnibus Company
 Bristol Tramways & Carriage Company
 Bullocks Coaches
 Burnley Bus Company
 Buses of Somerset
 Busways Travel Services

C
 Cardiff Bus
 Carousel Buses
 Carters Coach Services
 Central Scottish
 Centrebus
 Chaserider
 Cheltenham and Gloucester Omnibus Company
 Cheltenham District Traction
 ClickTrips
 Clyde Fastlink
 Clydeside Scottish
 CMT Buses
 Connect Buses
 Connect2Wiltshire
 Countywide Travel
 Coventry Corporation Transport
 Crawley Fastway
 Crosville Motor Services
 Crossgates Coaches (formerly Veolia Transport Cymru)
 CT4N
 Cumfybus

D
 Dales & District
 Damory Coaches
 Delaine Buses
 Devon General
 D&G Bus
 Diamond East Midlands
 Diamond North West
 Diamond South East
 Diamond West Midlands
 Docklands Buses
 Dot2Dot
 Dunn-Line

E
 Ealing Community Transport
 East Kent Road Car Company
 East London
 East Yorkshire Motor Services
 Eastern Counties Omnibus Company
 East Midland Motor Services
 Eastern National Omnibus Company
 Eastern Scottish
 EasyBus
 Edwards Coaches
 Ensignbus
 Epsom Coaches
 Express Motors

F
 Fastrack
 Felix Bus Services
 Finglands Coachways
 Fife Scottish
 First Aberdeen
 First Berkshire & The Thames Valley
 First Cymru
 First Essex
 First Glasgow
 First Greater Manchester
 First Hampshire & Dorset
 First Leicester
 First Norfolk & Suffolk
 First Potteries
 First South West
 First Kernow
 First South Yorkshire
 First Student UK
 First West of England
 Buses of Somerset
 First West Yorkshire
 First Bradford
 First Calderdale & Huddersfield
 First Leeds
 First Worcester
 First York
 Fleet Buzz
 Flexibus

G
 Gateshead Central Taxis (bus division)
 GHA Coaches
 Glasgow Citybus
 Glenvale Transport
 Go Cornwall Bus (part of Go South West)
 Go Devon Bus (part of Go South West)
 Go North East
 Go North West
 Go South Coast
 Go-Ahead London
 Golden Tours
 Grampian Regional Transport
 Green Line Coaches
 Green Triangle Buses
 GWR road motor services

H
 Halifax Joint Committee
 Halton Transport
 Hansons
 Hants & Dorset
 Harrogate Bus Company
 Hedingham & Chambers
 HCT Group
 Highland Scottish
 High Peak
 Holderness Area Rural Transport
 HTL Buses
 Hotel Hoppa
 Hulleys of Baslow

I
 Invictaway
 Ipswich Buses

J
 Jim Stones Coaches
 John Fishwick & Sons
 Johnsons Coach & Bus Travel
 Jolly Bus

K
 Keighley Bus Company
 Kelvin Central Buses
 Kinchbus
 Konectbus

L
 Lancashire United Transport
 Leicester City Transport
 Leicester Citybus
 LinkUp
 Let's Go, trading name of Travel Express Ltd, Wolverhampton. 
 Lloyds Coaches
 London Central
 London Country
 London Country North East
 London Country North West
 London Country South East
 London Country South West
 London Electrobus Company
 London General
 London General Omnibus Company
 London Pride Sightseeing
 London Sovereign
 London United
 Lothian Buses
 Lowland Scottish
 Lucketts Travel
 Ludlows
 Lynx

M
 Magic Bus
 Maidstone & District Motor Services
 Maidstone Corporation Transport
 Manchester Community Transport
 Mayne Coaches
 McGill's Bus Services
 McGill's Scotland East
 Megabus
 Metro (Belfast)
 Metrobus (South East England)
 Metroline
 Metroshuttle
 Metro Coastlines
 Midland Red
 Midland Fox
 Midland Red East
 Midland Red South
 Midland Red West
 Midland Scottish
 Minsterley Motors
 MK Metro
 Moss Motor Tours
 Mountain Goat
 Munro's of Jedburgh

N
 National Express Coaches
 National Express Coventry
 National Express West Midlands
 National Welsh Omnibus Services
 New Enterprise Coaches
 New Forest Tour
 Newport Bus
 NIBS Buses
 Nippy Bus
 North Birmingham Busways
 North Western Road Car Company (1923)
 North Western Road Car Company (1986)
 Northern General
 Northern Scottish
 Nottingham City Transport
 Nottingham Express Transit
 NSL Buses

O
 Oban & District
 OK Motor Services
 Oxford Bus Company

P
 Parks of Hamilton
 Pennine Blue
 People's Express
 Plymouth Citybus
 Premiere Travel
 Preston Bus
 Probus Management

Q
 Quality Line
 Quantock Motor Services

R
 Reading Buses
 Red & White Services
 Ribble Motor Services
 Richards Brothers
 Rhondda Transport Company
 Rosso
 Royal Mail Postbus
 Redline buses
 Red rose travel
 Red Eagle travel

S
 Safeguard Coaches
 Samuel Ledgard
 Scottish Bus Group
 Scottish Citylink
 Scottish Motor Traction
 Scottish Omnibuses
 Select Bus Service 
 Selkent
 Sheffield Community Transport
 Southampton Citybus
 South Gloucestershire Bus & Coach
 South Notts Bus Company
 South Wales Transport
 South West Coaches
 South Yorkshire Transport
 Southdown Motor Services
 Southdown PSV
 Southern National
 Southern Vectis
 Stagecoach East
 Stagecoach East Scotland
 Stagecoach Grimsby-Cleethorpes
 Stagecoach in Eastbourne
 Stagecoach in Hastings
 Stagecoach in Hull
 Stagecoach in Lincolnshire
 Stagecoach in Mansfield
 Stagecoach in Warwickshire
 Stagecoach London
 Stagecoach Manchester
 Stagecoach Merseyside
 Stagecoach Norfolk
 Stagecoach North East
 Stagecoach Oxfordshire
 Stagecoach Sheffield
 Stagecoach South
 Stagecoach South East
 Stagecoach South West
 Stagecoach South Wales
 Stagecoach Strathtay
 Stagecoach West
 Stagecoach West Scotland
 Stagecoach Yorkshire
Stagecoach Cumbria & North Lancs
 Stephensons of Essex
 Stotts Tours (Oldham)
 Strawberry
 Sullivan Buses
 Swansea Metro
 Swindon's Bus Company

T
 Tanat Valley Coaches
 Team Pennine
 Tellings-Golden Miller
 Thames Travel
 Thames Valley Buses
 Thames Valley Traction
 The Big Lemon
 The Kings Ferry
 Thomas Tilling
 TM Travel
 Tootbus London
 Tourist Group
 Tower Transit
 Transdev Blazefield
 Translink (Northern Ireland)
 Trathens Travel Services
 Travel de Courcey
 Travel Express
 Trentbarton
 Truronian
 Tates Travel

U
 Ulsterbus
 United Automobile Services
 United Counties Omnibus
 United Welsh
 Uno

V
 Vale of Llangollen Travel (t/a Vale Travel)

W
 Wardle Transport
 Warrington's Own Buses
 Webberbus
 Wessex Bus
 West Coast Motors
 West Riding Automobile Company
 Western Greyhound
 Western National
 Western Scottish
 Western SMT
 Western Welsh
 Whippet Coaches
 Wilfreda Beehive
 Wilts & Dorset

X
Xelabus
Xplore Dundee

Y
 Yellow Bus Services
 Yellow Buses
 Yelloway Motor Services
 Yorkshire Coastliner
 Yorkshire Terrier
 Yorkshire Traction

United Kingdom
Bus operating companies